"Already Best Friends" is a song by American rapper Jack Harlow, featuring American R&B singer Chris Brown. It was released through Warner, Generation Now and Atlantic Records, as the final single from Harlow's debut studio album, Thats What They All Say (2020), on March 30, 2021.

Background and composition
"Already Best Friends" initially was supposed to feature singer Tinashe, but her verse on the song was eventually replaced with Chris Brown's.

The song is a hip hop-infused R&B mid-tempo. In "Already Best Friends" Harlow and Brown sing about how they cross paths with two newly-formed best friends, which leads to a ménage à trois situation: "Two at a time, laying in my bed / One on top and the other give me head / Girl on girl I love the taste", Brown sings in a "smooth way", as described by Jade Boren of The Guardian. In the last verse Harlow asks the fictional best friends where their "mans" are, going on to rap, "She said 'What's that?' and they smiled at each other and they both laughed / I don't need a man, she my other half / We got something not a lot of others have / And I feel like I knew her from the past".

Music video
The music video for the song was shot in Tulum, Mexico, and published the day of release for the single. In the video, Brown shows off his moves as they walk through a packed party in the jungle.

Charts

Certifications

References

2020 songs
2021 singles
Jack Harlow songs
Atlantic Records singles
Chris Brown songs
Songs written by Chris Brown
Songs written by Jack Harlow